Deep Creek is a rural locality in the North Burnett Region, Queensland, Australia.

Geography 
The Burnett River forms part of the northern boundary of the locality. A number of creeks rises in the south of the locality and flow to the north where they become tributaries of the Burnett River.

The Gayndah Mundubbera Road passes through the locality from the north-east (Mount Debateable) to the north-west (Glenrae).

The principal land use is grazing, but there is some irrigated farming in the north of the locality near the Burnett River.

Education 
There are no schools in Deep Creek. The nearest primary and secondary schools are in Mundubbera (to Year 10) and in Gayndah (to Year 12).

References 

North Burnett Region
Localities in Queensland